Belladonnine is a member of class of tropane alkaloids. Belladonnine can be found in plants of family Solanaceae. Commercially available preparations called "belladonnine" are sometimes a mixture of this chemical with atropine.

References

Tropane alkaloids
Tropane alkaloids found in Solanaceae
Tetralins